Craig Figes (born 1978) is a British water polo player from Bristol. Figes went to Sir Bernard Lovell School in Oldland Common at the same time as Marcus Trescothick.   At the 2012 Summer Olympics, he competed for the Great Britain men's national water polo team in the men's event. Figes is a former geography teacher at Manchester Grammar School. He currently teaches geography at Sidcot School in North Somerset.

References

English male water polo players
1978 births
Living people
Olympic water polo players of Great Britain
Water polo players at the 2012 Summer Olympics